Issyk Kul Secondary School can refer to: 
 Issyk Kul Secondary School (Isfana) - a high school in Isfana
 There are many schools that bear this name; please expand the list